Mr. World Canada (sometimes informally referred to as Mr. Canada) is a Canadian male beauty pageant that runs in parallel with the Miss World Canada pageant, the two sending their winners to compete in the Mister World and Miss World pageants respectively.

Winners

2007: Darren Storsley of Langley, British Columbia, the organizer of the Miss BC World pageant, was named Mr. World Canada in 2007.
2010: Ron Wear of Edmonton, Alberta, a Canadian model and actor, won the competition in 2010. Wear went on to compete in Mister World 2010, but he did not win. Wear attested to his Mr. World Canada duties preventing him from pursuing an acting career to the extent that he would have liked. He won Mister International Canada in 2012.
2012: Frankie Cena of Burnaby, British Columbia won the Mr. World Canada competition in 2012. When he represented Canada at Mister World 2012, Cena ranked first at the talent show, second in the multimedia competition, and tenth overall. While Mr. World Canada, Cena sang at the Warmth of Light Musical Banquet hosted by Miss World Canada contestant Selina Yue. He went on to co-host multiple Mr. World and Miss World competitions.
2014: Jin Stewart of Vancouver, British Columbia won the Mr. World Canada competition in 2014. He later hosted Miss World Canada in 2015 and won Mister Global Canada in 2016.
2015: Jinder Atwal of Terrace, British Columbia was named Mr. World Canada in 2015.
2019: Alessandro Coward of Vancouver, British Columbia won the competition in 2019. He spoke openly about his struggles with his autism diagnosis.

See also 
 Mister World
 Miss World
 Mister World 2010
 Mister World 2012

References

Mister World
Beauty pageants in Canada
Annual events in Canada
Male beauty pageants
Canadian awards